Madera Springs, Texas is a ghost town in Jeff Davis County, Texas, located fourteen miles southwest of Toyahvale. Between 1964 and 1987, its recorded population was 2.

References

Ghost towns in West Texas